Tripladenia is a monotypic genus of plants in the family Colchicaceae. The sole species is Tripladenia cunninghamii which is native to New South Wales and Queensland in Australia.

References

Colchicaceae genera
Monotypic Liliales genera
Flora of Queensland
Flora of New South Wales
Monocots of Australia
Colchicaceae